The 6th Critics' Choice Awards were presented on January 22, 2001, honoring the finest achievements of 2000 filmmaking.

Top 10 films
(in alphabetical order)
Almost Famous
Billy Elliot
Cast Away
Crouching Tiger, Hidden Dragon (Wo hu cang long)
Erin Brockovich
Gladiator
Quills
Thirteen Days
Traffic
Wonder Boys

Winners

Best Actor:
Russell Crowe – Gladiator
Best Actress:
Julia Roberts – Erin Brockovich
Best Animated Feature:
Chicken Run
Best Child Performance:
Jamie Bell – Billy Elliot
Best Composer:
Hans Zimmer – Gladiator and The Road to El Dorado
Best Director:
Steven Soderbergh – Erin Brockovich and Traffic
Best Family Film:
My Dog Skip
Best Foreign Language Film:
Crouching Tiger, Hidden Dragon (Wo hu cang long) • China / Hong Kong
Best Picture:
Gladiator
Best Screenplay – Adapted:
Traffic – Stephen Gaghan
Best Screenplay – Original:
Almost Famous – Cameron Crowe
Best Song:
"My Funny Friend and Me" performed by Sting – The Emperor's New Groove
Best Supporting Actor:
Joaquin Phoenix – Gladiator and Quills
Best Supporting Actress:
Frances McDormand – Almost Famous and Wonder Boys
Best Inanimate Object:
Wilson the Volleyball – Cast Away

References

Broadcast Film Critics Association Awards
2000 film awards